S. 510: FDA Food Safety Modernization Act (govtrack.us)
 Nikon Coolpix series